Alfalfa (Medicago sativa), also called lucerne, is a perennial flowering plant in the legume family Fabaceae. It is cultivated as an important forage crop in many countries around the world. It is used for grazing, hay, and silage, as well as a green manure and cover crop. The name alfalfa is used in North America. The name lucerne is the more commonly used name in the United Kingdom, South Africa, Australia, and New Zealand. The plant superficially resembles clover (a cousin in the same family), especially while young, when trifoliate leaves comprising round leaflets predominate. Later in maturity, leaflets are elongated. It has clusters of small purple flowers followed by fruits spiralled in 2 to 3 turns containing 10–20 seeds. Alfalfa is native to warmer temperate climates. It has been cultivated as livestock fodder since at least the era of the ancient Greeks and Romans.

Etymology
The word alfalfa is a Spanish modification of the Arabic word al-faṣfaṣa ultimately from an Old Persian compound *aspa-sti- meaning horse food.

History 
Alfalfa seems to have originated in south-central Asia, and was first cultivated in ancient Iran. According to Pliny (died 79 AD), it was introduced to Greece in about 490 BC when the Persians invaded Greek territory. Alfalfa cultivation is discussed in the fourth-century AD book Opus Agriculturae by Palladius, stating: "One sow-down lasts ten years. The crop may be cut four or six times a year ... A jugerum of it is abundantly sufficient for three horses all the year ... It may be given to cattle, but new provender is at first to be administered very sparingly, because it bloats up the cattle." Pliny and Palladius called alfalfa in Latin medica, a name that referred to the Medes, a people who lived in ancient Iran. The ancient Greeks and Romans believed, probably correctly, that alfalfa came from the Medes' land, in today's Iran. (The ancient Greeks and Romans also used the name medica to mean a citron fruit, once again because it was believed to have come from the Medes' land). This name is the root of the modern scientific name for the alfalfa genus, Medicago.

The medieval Arabic agricultural writer Ibn al-'Awwam, who lived in Spain in the later 12th century, discussed how to cultivate alfalfa, which he called . A 13th-century general-purpose Arabic dictionary, Lisān al-'Arab, says that alfalfa is cultivated as an animal feed and consumed in both fresh and dried forms. It is from the Arabic that the Spanish name alfalfa was derived.

In the 16th century, Spanish colonizers introduced alfalfa to the Americas as fodder for their horses.

In the North American colonies of the eastern US in the 18th century, it was called "lucerne", and many trials at growing it were made, but generally without sufficiently successful results. Relatively little is grown in the southeastern United States today. Lucerne (or luzerne) is the name for alfalfa in Britain, Australia, France, Germany, and a number of other countries. Alfalfa seeds were imported to California from Chile in the 1850s. That was the beginning of a rapid and extensive introduction of the crop over the western US States and introduced the word "alfalfa" to the English language. Since North and South America now produce a large part of the world's output, the word "alfalfa" has been slowly entering other languages.

Ecology 
Alfalfa is a perennial forage legume which normally lives four to eight years, but can live more than 20 years, depending on variety and climate. Typically the root system grows to a depth of  depending on subsoil constraints. Owing to this deep root system, it helps to improve soil nitrogen fertility and protect from soil erosion. This depth of root system, and perenniality of crowns that store carbohydrates as an energy reserve, make it very resilient, especially to droughts. Alfalfa has a tetraploid genome.

Alfalfa is a small-seeded crop, and has a slowly growing seedling, but after several months of establishment, forms a tough "crown" at the top of the root system. This crown contains shoot buds that enable alfalfa to regrow many times after being grazed or harvested; however, overgrazing of the buds will reduce the new leaves on offer to the grazing animal.

This plant exhibits autotoxicity, which means it is difficult for alfalfa seed to grow in existing stands of alfalfa. Therefore, alfalfa fields are recommended to be rotated with other species (for example, corn or wheat) before reseeding. The exact mechanism of auto-toxicity is unclear, with medicarpins and phenols both seeming to play a role. Levels of autotoxicity in soil depends on soil type (clay soils maintain autotoxicity for longer), cultivar and age of the previous crop. A soil assay can be used to measure autotoxicity. Resistant to autotoxicity also varies by cultivar, a tolerant one being 'WL 656HQ'.

Culture 

Alfalfa is widely grown throughout the world as forage for cattle, and is most often harvested as hay, but can also be made into silage, grazed, or fed as greenchop. Alfalfa usually has the highest feeding value of all common hay crops. It is used less frequently as pasture. When grown on soils where it is well-adapted, alfalfa is often the highest-yielding forage plant, but its primary benefit is the combination of high yield per hectare and high nutritional quality.

Its primary use is as feed for high-producing dairy cows, because of its high protein content and highly digestible fiber, and secondarily for beef cattle, horses, sheep, and goats. Alfalfa hay is a widely used protein and fiber source for meat rabbits. In poultry diets, dehydrated alfalfa and alfalfa leaf concentrates are used for pigmenting eggs and meat, because of their high content in carotenoids, which are efficient for colouring egg yolk and body lipids. Humans also eat alfalfa sprouts in salads and sandwiches. Dehydrated alfalfa leaf is commercially available as a dietary supplement in several forms, such as tablets, powders and tea. Fresh alfalfa can cause bloating in livestock, so care must be taken with livestock grazing on alfalfa because of this hazard.

Like other legumes, its root nodules contain bacteria, Sinorhizobium meliloti, with the ability to fix nitrogen, producing a high-protein feed regardless of available nitrogen in the soil. Its nitrogen-fixing ability (which increases soil nitrogen) and its use as an animal feed greatly improve agricultural efficiency.

Alfalfa can be sown in spring or fall, and does best on well-drained soils with a neutral pH of 6.8–7.5. Alfalfa requires sustained levels of potassium and phosphorus to grow well. It is moderately sensitive to salt levels in both the soil and irrigation water, although it continues to be grown in the arid southwestern United States, where salinity is an emerging issue. Soils low in fertility should be fertilized with manure or a chemical fertilizer, but correction of pH is particularly important. A nurse crop is sometimes used, particularly for spring plantings, to reduce weed problems and soil erosion, but can lead to competition for light, water, and nutrients.

In most climates, alfalfa is cut three to four times a year, but it can be harvested up to 12 times per year in Arizona and southern California. Yields vary with region, weather, and the crop's stage of maturity when cut. Later cuttings improve yield, but with reduced nutritional content.

Beneficial insects 

Alfalfa is considered an insectary, a place where insects are reared, and has been proposed as helpful to other crops, such as cotton, if the two are interplanted, because the alfalfa harbours predatory and parasitic insects that would protect the other crop. Harvesting the alfalfa by mowing the entire crop area destroys the insect population, but this can be avoided by mowing in strips so that part of the growth remains.

Pests and diseases 

Like most plants, alfalfa can be attacked by various pests and pathogens. Diseases often have subtle symptoms which are easily misdiagnosed and can affect leaves, roots, and stems.

Some pests, such as the alfalfa weevil, aphids, armyworms, and the potato leafhopper, can reduce alfalfa yields dramatically, particularly with the second cutting when weather is warmest. Spotted alfalfa aphid, broadly spread in Australia, not only sucks sap but also injects salivary toxins into the leaves. Registered insecticides or chemical controls are sometimes used to prevent this and labels will specify the withholding period before the forage crop can be grazed or cut for hay or silage. Alfalfa is also susceptible to root rots, including Phytophthora, Rhizoctonia, and Texas root rot. Alfalfa is also susceptible to downy mildew caused by the oomycete species Peronospora aestivalis.

Harvesting 

When alfalfa is to be used as hay, it is usually cut and baled. Loose haystacks are still used in some areas, but bales are easier for use in transportation, storage, and feed. Ideally, the first cutting should be taken at the bud stage, and the subsequent cuttings just as the field is beginning to flower, or one-tenth bloom because carbohydrates are at their highest. When using farm equipment rather than hand-harvesting, a swather cuts the alfalfa and arranges it in windrows. In areas where the alfalfa does not immediately dry out on its own, a machine known as a mower-conditioner is used to cut the hay. The mower-conditioner has a set of rollers or flails that crimp and break the stems as they pass through the mower, making the alfalfa dry faster. After the alfalfa has dried, a tractor pulling a baler collects the hay into bales.

Several types of bales are commonly used for alfalfa. For small animals and individual horses, the alfalfa is baled into small, two-string bales, commonly named by the strands of string used to wrap it. Other bale sizes are three-string, and so on up to half-ton (six-string) "square" bales – actually rectangular, and typically about 40 x 45 x 100 cm (14 x 18 x 38 in). Small square bales weigh from  depending on moisture, and can be easily hand separated into "flakes". These bales can be placed in stable stacks or in large feeders for herds of horses or unrolled on the ground for large herds of cattle. The bales can be loaded and stacked with a tractor using a spike, known as a bale spear, that pierces the center of the bale, or they can be handled with a grapple (claw) on the tractor's front-end loader. A more recent innovation is large "square" bales, roughly the same proportions as the small squares, but much larger. The bale size was set so stacks would fit perfectly on a large flatbed truck. These are more common in the western United States.

When used as feed for dairy cattle, alfalfa is often made into haylage by a process known as ensiling. Rather than being dried to make dry hay, the alfalfa is chopped finely and fermented in silos, trenches, or bags, where the oxygen supply can be limited to promote fermentation. The anaerobic fermentation of alfalfa allows it to retain high nutrient levels similar to those of fresh forage, and is also more palatable to dairy cattle than dry hay. In many cases, alfalfa silage is inoculated with different strains of microorganisms to improve the fermentation quality and aerobic stability of the silage.

Worldwide production 

During the early 2000s, alfalfa was the most cultivated forage legume in the world. Worldwide production was around 436 million tons in 2006. In 2009, alfalfa was grown on approximately  worldwide; of this North America produced 41%, Europe produced 25%, South America produced 23%, Asia produced 8%, and Africa and Oceania produced the remainder.

United States 
In the United States in 2012, the leading alfalfa-growing states were California, Idaho, and Montana. Alfalfa is predominantly grown in the northern and western United States; it can be grown in the southeastern United States, but leaf and root diseases, poor soils, and a lack of well-adapted varieties are often limitations.

California 
Varieties resistant to the spotted alfalfa aphid (Therioaphis maculata) are necessary there, but even that is not always enough due to constant resistance evolution. See also .

Australia

New South Wales 
It is New South Wales that produces 40% of Australia's lucerne. Due to the introduction of the spotted alfalfa aphid (Therioaphis maculata) in the 1700s all varieties grown there must be resistant to it (see also ).

Alfalfa and bees 

Alfalfa seed production requires the presence of pollinators when the fields of alfalfa are in bloom. Alfalfa pollination is somewhat problematic, however, because western honey bees, the most commonly used pollinator, are less than ideal for this purpose; the pollen-carrying keel of the alfalfa flower trips and strikes pollinating bees on the head, which helps transfer the pollen to the foraging bee. Western honey bees, however, do not like being struck in the head repeatedly and learn to defeat this action by drawing nectar from the side of the flower. The bees thus collect the nectar, but carry no pollen, so do not pollinate the next flower they visit. Because older, experienced bees do not pollinate alfalfa well, most pollination is accomplished by young bees that have not yet learned the trick of robbing the flower without tripping the head-knocking keel.

When western honey bees are used to pollinate alfalfa, the beekeeper stocks the field at a very high rate to maximize the number of young bees. However, Western honey bee colonies may suffer protein stress when working alfalfa only, because alfalfa pollen protein is deficient in isoleucine, one of the amino acids essential in the diet of honeybee larvae.

Today, the alfalfa leafcutter bee (Megachile rotundata) is increasingly used to circumvent these problems. As a solitary but gregarious bee species, it does not build colonies or store honey, but is a very efficient pollinator of alfalfa flowers. Nesting is in individual tunnels in wooden or plastic material, supplied by the alfalfa seed growers. The leafcutter bees are used in the Pacific Northwest, while western honeybees dominate in California alfalfa seed production.

M. rotundata was unintentionally introduced into the United States during the 1940s, and its management as a pollinator of alfalfa has led to a three-fold increase in seed production in the U.S. The synchronous emergence of the adult bees of this species during alfalfa blooming period in combination with such behaviors as gregarious nesting, and utilization of leaves and nesting materials that have been mass-produced by humans provide positive benefits for the use of these bees in pollinating alfalfa.

A smaller amount of alfalfa produced for seed is pollinated by the alkali bee, mostly in the northwestern United States. It is cultured in special beds near the fields. These bees also have their own problems. They are not portable like honey bees, and when fields are planted in new areas, the bees take several seasons to build up. Honey bees are still trucked to many of the fields at bloom time.

B. affinis is important to the agricultural industry, as well as for the pollination of alfalfa. It is known that members of this species pollinate up to 65 different species of plants, and it is the primary pollinator of key dietary crops, such as cranberries, plums, apples, onions, and alfalfa.

Varieties 

Considerable research and development has been done with this important plant. Older cultivars such as 'Vernal' have been the standard for years, but many public and private varieties better adapted to particular climates are available. Private companies release many new varieties each year in the US.

Most varieties go dormant in the fall, with reduced growth in response to low temperatures and shorter days. 'Nondormant' varieties that grow through the winter are planted in long-season environments such as Mexico, Arizona, and Southern California, whereas 'dormant' varieties are planted in the Upper Midwest, Canada, and the Northeast. 'Nondormant' varieties can be higher-yielding, but they are susceptible to winter-kill in cold climates and have poorer persistence.

Most alfalfa cultivars contain genetic material from sickle medick (M. falcata), a crop wild relative of alfalfa that naturally hybridizes with M. sativa to produce sand lucerne (M. sativa ssp. varia). This species may bear either the purple flowers of alfalfa or the yellow of sickle medick, and is so called for its ready growth in sandy soil.<ref>Joseph Elwyn Wing, Alfalfa Farming in the U.S. 79 (Sanders Publishing Co. 1912)".</ref> Traits for insect resistance have also been introduced from M. glomerata and M. prostrata, members of alfalfa's secondary gene pool.

Most of the improvements in alfalfa over the last decades have consisted of better disease resistance on poorly drained soils in wet years, better ability to overwinter in cold climates, and the production of more leaves. Multileaf alfalfa varieties have more than three leaflets per leaf.

Alfalfa growers or lucerne growers have a suite of varieties or cultivars to choose from in the seed marketplace and base their selection on a number of factors including the dormancy or activity rating, crown height, fit for purpose (i.e., hay production or grazing), disease resistance, insect pest resistance, forage yield, fine leafed varieties and a combination of many favourable attributes. Plant breeding efforts use scientific methodology and technology to strive for new improved varieties.

The L. Teweles Seed Company claimed it created the world's first hybrid alfalfa.

Wisconsin and California and many other states publish alfalfa variety trial data. A complete listing of state variety testing data is provided by the North American Alfalfa Improvement Conference (NAAIC) State Listing, as well as additional detailed alfalfa genetic and variety data published by NAAIC.

 Genetic modification
Roundup Ready alfalfa, a genetically modified variety, was released by Forage Genetics International in 2005. This was developed through the insertion of a gene owned by Monsanto Company that confers resistance to glyphosate, a broad-spectrum herbicide, also known as Roundup. Although most grassy and broadleaf plants, including ordinary alfalfa, are killed by Roundup, growers can spray fields of Roundup Ready alfalfa with the glyphosate herbicide and kill the weeds without harming the alfalfa crop.

 Legal issues in the US 
In 2005, after completing a 28-page environmental assessment (EA) the United States Department of Agriculture (USDA) granted Roundup Ready alfalfa (RRA) nonregulated status under Code of Federal Regulations Title 7 Part 340, called, "Introduction of Organisms and Products Altered or Produced Through Genetic Engineering Which Are Plant Pests or Which There Is Reason to Believe Are Plant Pests", which regulates, among other things, the introduction (importation, interstate movement, or release into the environment) of organisms and products altered or produced through genetic engineering that are plant pests or that there is reason to believe are plant pests. Monsanto had to seek deregulation to conduct field trials of RRA, because the RRA contains a promoter sequence derived from the plant pathogen figwort mosaic virus. The USDA granted the application for deregulation, stating that the RRA with its modifications: "(1) Exhibit no plant pathogenic properties; (2) are no more likely to become weedy than the nontransgenic parental line or other cultivated alfalfa; (3) are unlikely to increase the weediness potential of any other cultivated or wild species with which it can interbreed; (4) will not cause damage to raw or processed agricultural commodities; (5) will not harm threatened or endangered species or organisms that are beneficial to agriculture; and (6) should not reduce the ability to control pests and weeds in alfalfa or other crops." Monsanto started selling RRA and within two years, more than 300,000 acres were devoted to the plant in the US.

The granting of deregulation was opposed by many groups, including growers of non-GM alfalfa who were concerned about gene flow into their crops. In 2006, the Center for Food Safety, a US non-governmental organization that is a critic of biotech crops, and others, challenged this deregulation in the California Northern District Court. Organic growers were concerned that the GM alfalfa could cross-pollinate with their organic alfalfa, making their crops unsalable in countries that ban the growing of GM crops. The District Court ruled that the USDA's EA did not address two issues concerning RRA's effect on the environment, and in 2007, required the USDA to complete a much more extensive environmental impact statement (EIS). Until the EIS was completed, they banned further planting of RRA but allowed land already planted to continue.Memorandum and Order Re: Permanent Injunction United States District Court for Northern California, Case No C 06-01075 CR, 3 May 2007. Retrieved 13 November 2011 The USDA proposed a partial deregulation of RRA but this was also rejected by the District Court. Planting of RRA was halted.

In June 2009, a divided three-judge panel on the 9th U.S. Circuit Court of Appeals upheld the District Court's decision. Monsanto and others appealed to the US Supreme Court.

On 21 June 2010, in Monsanto Co. v. Geertson Seed Farms'', the Supreme Court overturned the District Court decision to ban planting RRA nationwide as there was no evidence of irreparable injury. They ruled that the USDA could partially deregulate RRA before an EIS was completed. The Supreme Court did not consider the District Court's ruling disallowing RRA's deregulation and consequently RRA was still a regulated crop waiting for USDA's completion of an EIS.

This decision was welcomed by the American Farm Bureau Federation, Biotechnology Industry Organization, American Seed Trade Association, American Soybean Association, National Alfalfa and Forage Alliance, National Association of Wheat Growers, National Cotton Council, and National Potato Council. In July 2010, 75 members of Congress from both political parties sent a letter to Agriculture Secretary Tom Vilsack asking him to immediately allow limited planting of genetically engineered alfalfa. However the USDA did not issue interim deregulatory measures, instead focusing on completing the EIS. Their 2,300-page EIS was published in December 2010. It concluded that RRA would not affect the environment.

Three of the biggest natural food brands in the US lobbied for a partial deregulation of RRA, but in January 2011, despite protests from organic groups, Secretary Vilsack announced that the USDA had approved the unrestricted planting of genetically modified alfalfa and planting resumed. Secretary Vilsack commented, "After conducting a thorough and transparent examination of alfalfa ... APHIS [Animal and Plant Health Inspection Service] has determined that Roundup Ready alfalfa is as safe as traditionally bred alfalfa." About 20 million acres (8 million hectares) of alfalfa were grown in the US, the fourth-biggest crop by acreage, of which about 1% were organic. Some biotechnology officials forecast that half of the US alfalfa acreage could eventually be planted with GM alfalfa.

The National Corn Growers Association, the American Farm Bureau Federation, and the Council for Biotech Information warmly applauded this decision. Christine Bushway, CEO of the Organic Trade Association, said, "A lot of people are shell-shocked. While we feel Secretary Vilsack worked on this issue, which is progress, this decision puts our organic farmers at risk." The Organic Trade Association issued a press release in 2011 saying that the USDA recognized the impact that cross-contamination could have on organic alfalfa and urged them to place restrictions to minimize any such contamination. However, organic farming groups, organic food outlets, and activists responded by publishing an open letter saying that planting the "alfalfa without any restrictions flies in the face of the interests of conventional and organic farmers, preservation of the environment, and consumer choice." Senator Debbie Stabenow, Chairwoman of the Senate Agriculture Committee, House Agriculture Committee Chairman Frank Lucas and Senator Richard Lugar issued statements strongly supporting the decision "... giving growers the green light to begin planting an abundant, affordable and safe crop" and giving farmers and consumers the choice ... in planting or purchasing food grown with GM technology, conventionally, or organically." In a joint statement, US Senator Patrick Leahy and Representative Peter DeFazio said the USDA had the "opportunity to address the concerns of all farmers", but instead "surrender[ed] to business as usual for the biotech industry."

The non-profit Center for Food Safety appealed this decision in March 2011 but the District Court for Northern California rejected this motion in 2012.

Phytoestrogens in alfalfa and effect on livestock fertility 
Alfalfa, like other leguminous crops, is a known source of phytoestrogens, including spinasterol, coumestrol, and coumestan. Because of this, grazing on alfalfa during breeding can cause reduced fertility in sheep and in dairy cattle if not effectively managed.

Coumestrol levels in alfalfa have been shown to be elevated by fungal infection, but not significantly under drought stress or aphid infestation. Grazing management can be utilised to mitigate the effects of coumestrol on ewe reproductive performance, with full recovery after removal from alfalfa. Coumestrol levels in unirrigated crops can be predicted practically using weather variables.

Toxicity of canavanine 
Raw alfalfa seeds and sprouts are a source of the amino acid canavanine. Much of the canavanine is converted into other amino acids during germination so sprouts contain much less canavanine than unsprouted seeds. Canavanine competes with arginine, resulting in the synthesis of dysfunctional proteins. Raw unsprouted alfalfa has toxic effects in primates, including humans, which can result in lupus-like symptoms and other immunological diseases in susceptible individuals, and sprouts also produced these symptoms in at least some primates when fed a diet made of 40% alfalfa. Stopping consumption of alfalfa seeds can reverse the effects.

Nutritional value 

Raw alfalfa seed sprouts are 93% water, 2% carbohydrates, 4% protein, and contain negligible fat (table). In a  reference amount, raw alfalfa sprouts supply  of food energy and 29% of the Daily Value of vitamin K. They are a moderate source of vitamin C, some B vitamins, phosphorus, and zinc.

Sprouting 

Sprouting alfalfa seeds is the process of germinating seeds for consumption usually involving just water and a jar. However, the seeds and sprouts must be rinsed regularly to avoid the accumulation of the products of decay organisms along with smells of rot and discoloration. Sprouting alfalfa usually takes three to four days with one tablespoon of seed yielding up to three full cups of sprouts.

Health effects 

The United States National Institutes of Health (US NIH) reports there is "Insufficient evidence to rate effectiveness [of alfalfa] for" the following:
 High cholesterol 
 Kidney problems
 Bladder problems
 Prostate problems
 Asthma
 Arthritis
 Diabetes
 Upset stomach
 Other conditions

Further, the US NIH has identified several safety concerns and medication interactions.
US NIH summarizes: 
Alfalfa leaves are POSSIBLY SAFE for most adults. However, taking alfalfa seeds long-term is LIKELY UNSAFE. Alfalfa seed products may cause reactions that are similar to the autoimmune disease called lupus erythematosus.

Alfalfa might also cause some people's skin to become extra sensitive to the sun.
As noted above, raw unsprouted alfalfa has toxic effects in primates, including humans, which can result in lupus-like symptoms and other immunological diseases in susceptible individuals.

The US NIH calls out special precautions and warnings for the following:
 Pregnancy or breast-feeding: Using alfalfa in amounts larger than what is commonly found in food is possibly unsafe during pregnancy and breast-feeding. There is some evidence that alfalfa may act like estrogen, and this might affect the pregnancy.
 Auto-immune diseases: Alfalfa might cause the immune system to become more active, and this could increase the symptoms of these diseases.
 Hormone-sensitive conditions (such as breast cancer, uterine cancer, ovarian cancer, endometriosis, or uterine fibroids): Alfalfa might have the same effects as the female hormone estrogen.
 Diabetes: Alfalfa might lower blood sugar levels.
 Kidney transplant: There is one report of a kidney transplant rejection following the three-month use of a supplement that contained alfalfa and black cohosh. This outcome is more likely due to alfalfa than black cohosh. Alfalfa's immune system boost might make the anti-rejection drug cyclosporine less effective.

US NIH warns that alfalfa interacts with warfarin (Coumadin) in a major way; the two should not be combined.
US NIH warns that alfalfa interacts with the following medicine types moderately; the user should be cautious when taking alfalfa with these:
 Birth control pills (contraceptive drugs)
 Estrogens – Large amounts of alfalfa might have some of the same effects as estrogen. However, even large amounts of alfalfa are not as strong as estrogen pills. Taking alfalfa along with estrogen pills might decrease the effects of estrogen pills.
 Medications for diabetes (antidiabetes drugs)
 Medications that decrease the immune system (immunosuppressants)
 Medications that increase sensitivity to sunlight (photosensitizing drugs)

US NIH warns that alfalfa may interact with herbs and supplements associated with the following:
 Those that might lower blood sugar
 Iron
 Vitamin E

Gallery

References

External links 

 Grassland Species profile 
 National Alfalfa Alliance

Forages
Medicago
Nitrogen-fixing crops
Plants used in Ayurveda
Plants used in traditional Chinese medicine
Pollination management
Vegetables